VBC Waremme is a volleyball club based in Waremme, Belgium. It plays in the Belgian Volleyball League.

History
The creation of VBC Waremme dates back to 1999, when two local clubs, Schbing Waremme and Muronday's Oreye, decided to fuse together with the aim of creating a single big club in the Waremme area.
Starting its first season at the highest level of provincial volleyball, the club slowly rose through the ranks, managing to reach the highest division in men's volleyball in Belgium, the Belgian Volleyball League.

Past Results
 1999-2000: 2nd in the 1st Provincial  Division Liége and promotion to the 3rd National Division.
 2003-2004: Champion in the 3rd National Division. and promotion to the 2nd National Division.
 2004-2005: Champion in the 2nd National Division and promotion to the 1st National Division.
 2009-2010: 2nd in the 1st National Division and promotion to the Ligue A and not to Ligue B following the restructuration of the leagues.

Honours 
 Liège Provincial Cup (4)
 Winner :  2004, 2005, 2006, 2007

First Team Coaches 
Below is the list of the past coaches of the VBC Waremme, starting from its inception.

Squad

Coach:  Philippe Barca-Cysique
Ass.Coach:  Frédéric Servotte

References

External links 
 http://www.vbc-waremme.be

Belgian volleyball clubs